Esko Tie (born 26 December 1928 in Vanaja, Finland - died 15 May 2002) was a professional ice hockey player who played in the SM-liiga. He played for Hämeenlinnan Tarmo and HPK. He was inducted into the Finnish Hockey Hall of Fame in 1994.

External links
 Finnish Hockey Hall of Fame bio

1928 births
2002 deaths
Finnish ice hockey players
HPK players